The Lion's Perfect Expressive Power is one of the Seventeen tantras of Dzogchen Upadesha.

Primary resources
seng ge rtsal rdzogs chen po'i rgyud @ Wikisource in Wylie
སེང་གེ་རྩལ་རྫོགས་ཆེན་པོའི་རྒྱུད @ Wikisource in Uchen (Tibetan Script), Unicode

Notes

Dzogchen texts
Nyingma tantras